The WTA Finals (formerly known as the WTA Tour Championships or WTA Championships) is a tournament of the Women's Tennis Association (WTA) played annually at the end of the season. The event is uniquely reserved for players at the top of the WTA rankings. The format predates WTA and started in 1972 as the Championship tournament of WTA Tour's predecessor: the Virginia Slims Circuit. Since 2003 there have been eight singles players divided into two round-robin groups, and eight doubles teams.

The WTA Finals has the largest prize money and ranking points after the majors. The most successful player is Martina Navratilova with 8 singles and 13 doubles titles.

Tournament

History
The championships were held for the first time in October 1972 in Boca Raton, Florida (USA) as a climactic event at the end of a series of tournaments sponsored by Virginia Slims, called the Virginia Slims Circuit. From 1972 to 1974, the event was held in October, before switching to March from 1975 until 1986. The WTA then decided to adopt a January–November playing season, and so the event was switched to being held at the end of each year. As a consequence, there were two championships held in 1986.

The event was held in Los Angeles, California from 1974 to 1976 before moving to Madison Square Garden in New York City in 1977. With the exception of a one-year move to Oakland, California in 1978, the Championships remained at MSG until 2000. The event then briefly moved to Munich, Germany in 2001. More recently, it moved back to Los Angeles from 2002 to 2005. The 2006 and 2007 editions were held in Madrid, Spain. Doha, Qatar hosted the 2008–2010 editions before passing the flag to Istanbul, Turkey, which hosted the 2011–2013 editions. For the right to host the 2014 edition and beyond, 43 cities expressed an interest before a short list comprising Kazan, Russia; Mexico City, Mexico; Singapore; and Tianjin, China was drawn up in late 2012. Kazan and Mexico City were ruled out in early 2013 before Singapore was announced in May 2013 as the new host city for five years. In 2018, WTA announced the new host city from 2019 to 2028 will be Shenzhen, China, however the 2020 event was canceled and the 2021 event was moved to Guadalajara, Mexico due to COVID-19 pandemic and travel restrictions. In December 2021, WTA announced "immediate suspension of all WTA tournaments in China, including Hong Kong", over concerns of Chinese government's treatment of tennis player Peng Shuai after she accused a top Communist Party leader of sexual assault.

Format 
From 1984 to 1998, the final of the championships was a best-of-five-sets match, making it the only tournament on the women's tour to have had a best-of-five match at any round of the competition. It was the first time since the 1901 U.S. National Championships that the best-of-five format was used in women's matches. In 1999, the final reverted to being a best-of-three-sets match. From the 1974 until the 1982 edition the doubles draw consisted of four teams; then from 1983 to 2002 the draw increased to eight teams; was decreased back to four teams until 2013 and from the 2014 edition onward it has been made up of eight teams. From its first inception in 1973 until 2018 the doubles draw was played in a single elimination format. In 2015 and from 2019 until the present the doubles draw has been played in a round robin format.

Qualified players and teams participate in a round-robin format in two groups of four. The winners and runners-up of each group advance to the semifinals. The semifinal winners progress through to the finals where they compete for the title.

Qualification 
To qualify for the WTA Finals, WTA players compete throughout the year in over 53 WTA tournaments throughout the world, as well as the four Grand Slam events. Players earn ranking points on the Porsche Race To Shenzhen leaderboard, and the top 7 singles players (and usually top 8) and top 8 doubles teams on this leaderboard at the conclusion of the year (as of the Monday following the final regular season tournament) earn the right to compete in the WTA Championships. For singles, all results from that year count towards a player's ranking. The eighth spot in singles is not guaranteed a place in the finals as the WTA has some leeway per the WTA rules.

In the singles, point totals are calculated by combining point totals from 16 tournaments (excluding ITF and WTA 125 tournaments). Of these sixteen tournaments, a player's results: from the four Grand Slam events, the four WTA 1000 tournaments with 1,000 points for the winner, and (for the players who played the main draw at least in 2 such tournaments) the best results from two WTA 1000 tournaments with 900 points maximum must be included as well as points from 6 other countable tournaments. In the doubles, point totals are calculated by any combination of eleven tournaments throughout the year, not abiding to the mandatory Grand-Slam or Premier-level tournaments rule like for singles.

Venues

Prize money and points
The total prize money for the 2022 WTA Finals is US$5,000,000. The tables below are based on the updated draw sheet information.

 An undefeated champion would earn the maximum 1,500 points, and $1,680,000 in singles or $360,000 in doubles.
Since 2014, the singles and doubles winners of the tournament receive the Billie Jean King Trophy and the Martina Navratilova trophy, respectively.

List of finals

Singles

Doubles

Titles by country

Singles

List of champions

Records and statistics 
Note: Active players indicated in bold.

Singles

Youngest & oldest champions

Longest and shortest matches

Singles 

Best-of-five-sets system:

Best-of-three-sets system:

Doubles

Year-end championships double & triple
Winning three or two out of the four Year-ending championships since its inception in 1972: WTA Championships/Finals, Series-Ending Championships, Grand Slam Cup, WTA Tournament of Champions/Elite Trophy indicated in bold.

Double crown 
Winning the Year-end championships in both singles and doubles in the same year.

Year-end championships triple

WTA Championships – Series-Ending Championships Double

WTA Championships – Grand Slam Cup Double

WTA Championships – WTA Elite Trophy Double

Grand Slam Cup – WTA Elite Trophy Double

Sponsors 
The event has a more than 40-year history of corporate sponsorship with the finals named after the sponsoring company.

See also
 Toyota Championships
 WTA Finals appearances
 WTA Elite Trophy
 ATP Finals

References

External links
 

 

Recurring sporting events established in 1972
Articles which contain graphical timelines
1972 establishments in Florida